

Alternative spellings 

 Malasenco
 Malashenco
 Malasenko

Origins 

This surname is a moderately common Ukrainian name and was formed from the Hebrew name Malachi. After 988 A.D. — the year of The Baptism of Russia or The Christianization of Kievan Rus', every Slav, having been baptized, would undergo a ceremony, conducted by a priest, to receive a Christian name. Consequently, Church names became the basis of the formation of surnames.

Meaning 

The surname Malashnko was formed, based on the male name Malachi, which means "messenger of God" or, more precisely, "messenger of Elohim." Colloquially, in Slavic languages, that name had several forms (Slavic diminutive versions of the name): Malaphei, Malahei, Malaha, Malash, and Malasha. The Malasha version became the basis for the surname Malashenko.

Timeline 

Most likely, this surname was formed in the 14th century. Originally, the "-enko" suffix meant "son of." However, later on, that meaning was lost, and the suffix "-enko" remained only in surnames.

Regardless of the way the surname is spelled, it is pronounced the same way for all the alternatives: the spellings with an "S" in the middle are still pronounced as "SH" (which corresponds to the Cyrillic "Ш").

People 
 Igor Malashenko : Russian and Soviet TV executive.

References

 http://www.ufolog.ru/names/order/%D0%9C%D0%B0%D0%BB%D0%B0%D1%88%D0%B5%D0%BD%D0%BA%D0%BE
 http://arc.familyspace.ru/catalog/Malashenko
 http://www.analizfamilii.ru/Malashenko/

Surnames